These are the squads for the countries that played in the 1989 Copa América held in Brazil.

Group A

Brazil 
Head Coach: Sebastião Lazaroni

Charles and Ze Carlos added to the squad for the final phase.
Tita and Ze Teodoro injured replaced for Bismarck Faria and Josimar for final Phase

Colombia 
Head Coach: Francisco Maturana

Paraguay 
Head Coach:  Eduardo Luján Manera.

Ramón Escobar added to the squad for the final phase.

Peru 
Head Coach:  Pepe

Venezuela 
Head Coach:

Group B

Argentina 
Head Coach: Carlos Bilardo

Ricardo Giusti and Abel Balbo added to the squad for the final phase

Bolivia 
Head Coach:  Jorge Habegger

Chile 
Head Coach: Orlando Aravena

Ecuador 
Head Coach:  Dušan Drašković

Uruguay 
Head Coach: Oscar Tabárez

Oscar Ferro and Edison Suarez added to the squad for the final phase

External links
1989 Copa América squads at RSSSF

Copa América squads
1989 Copa América